Christiane Pelchat (born August 28, 1959) is a former Canadian politician, who represented the electoral district of Vachon in the National Assembly of Quebec from 1985 to 1994. She was a member of the Quebec Liberal Party.

She is the president of Quebec's provincial Council on the Status of Women from November 30, 2006 to August 15, 2011, when she was named Quebec's delegate-general in Mexico City.

References

1959 births
Quebec Liberal Party MNAs
Women MNAs in Quebec
People from Longueuil
Living people
French Quebecers